Dmitri Vladimirovich Timachev (born 2 February 1983) is a former Russian professional footballer.

Club career
He made his Russian Football National League debut for FC Metallurg-Kuzbass Novokuznetsk on 27 July 2004 in a game against FC Arsenal Tula.

External links
 

1983 births
Sportspeople from Volgograd
Living people
Russian footballers
FC Dynamo Moscow reserves players
Russian expatriate footballers
Expatriate footballers in Latvia
Dinaburg FC players
Russian expatriate sportspeople in Latvia
FC Salyut Belgorod players
FC Sokol Saratov players
FC Olimpia Volgograd players
FC Rotor Volgograd players
Association football defenders
FC Chernomorets Novorossiysk players
FC Avangard Kursk players
FC Novokuznetsk players
Latvian Higher League players